Slim Jim is an American snack brand sold globally and manufactured by Conagra Brands. They are widely available and popular in the United States, with 2015 revenues of $575 million. About 569 million of the cylindrical meat sticks are produced annually in at least 21 varieties.

History
Jack Comella invented the first Slim Jim in 1929 in Philadelphia, although he and his partner, Adolph Levis, subsequently hired a meatpacker to develop the product for production in the 1940s. He later sold the company in 1967 for about $20 million to General Mills, which moved the operations to Raleigh, North Carolina, and merged them into the meatpacking operations of their recently-acquired Jesse Jones Sausage Co. to create Goodmark Foods. Ron Doggett moved to Raleigh in 1969 as he was named corporate controller of the newly-formed entity, and was later the company's Vice President of Finance. In 1982, General Mills put the company up for sale, and Doggett and three other GoodMark executives acquired the company; Doggett assumed the offices of president and chief operating officer. ConAgra bought Goodmark in 1998. Until 2009, the former Jones Sausage plant in Garner, North Carolina was the only facility in the world which produced Slim Jims.

The product Levis created is different from the one produced since the 1990s, with Lon Adams (1925–2020) developing the current Slim Jim recipe while working for Goodmark.

Production was interrupted after an explosion and fire on June 9, 2009, heavily damaged the plant in Garner, killing three workers and a subcontractor worker. ConAgra reopened the plant six weeks after the incident.  Since it could only produce at about half of its original capacity, ConAgra arranged for other facilities to produce Slim Jims including facility in Troy, Ohio. On May 20, 2011, the facility in Garner closed, the same day that the company's former spokesman "Macho Man" Randy Savage died.

Advertising campaigns

From 1993 to 2000, advertising for the product included commercials that featured professional wrestler "Macho Man" Randy Savage, who served as spokesperson. Each commercial would close with Savage bellowing "Need a little excitement? Snap into a Slim Jim!" Other notable spokespersons have included rapper Vanilla Ice and wrestlers The Ultimate Warrior, Bam Bam Bigelow, Kevin Nash, and Edge.

The advertising campaign was developed at North Castle Partners in Greenwich, Connecticut, by Tom Leland and Roger Martensen, under the creative direction of Hal Rosen. The "Snap Into A Slim Jim" concept was originally intended for comedian Sam Kinison, but he declined. Hal Rosen then suggested using WWF wrestlers, and The Ultimate Warrior was selected for the kickoff spot. In addition to a TV spot, the Ultimate Warrior also recorded several radio commercials for Slim Jim in 1991.

A subsequent campaign featured Slim Jim Guy (played by actor Demetri Goritsas), a human personification of a Slim Jim who would wreak havoc on the digestive system of anyone who ate it and used the slogan "Eat me!" These ads personified the irreverent personality of the brand and were also from North Castle Partners. 

Slim Jim advertisements were also heavily featured on MTV, ESPN, WWF, WCW, and Disney Channel.  Slim Jim was one of the earliest sponsors of the ASA Pro Tour (the aggressive inline skating tour) from 1997 to 2000.  The ASA Pro Tour was a qualifier for ESPN's X Games.

In 2005, Slim Jim advertising featured the Fairy Snapmother, described in a ConAgra press release as "a character resembling a tattooed rocker with wings – and a familiar MTV-type of humor young males enjoy."

Another campaign depicted hunters hunting a fictitious "Snapalope" within convenience stores using urban camouflage. The Snapalope is a deer-like puppet made from Slim Jims.

In 2008, Slim Jim launched the website "SpicySide.com", encouraging consumers to get in touch with their "Spicy Side" by creating an avatar and fighting their friends in an online landscape called Spicy Town.  Slim Jim also partnered with a well known Machinima artist Myndflame to develop a World of Warcraft parody.

As of 2012, the company uses social media as a method of advertisement, using internet humour and memes to gain popularity online, creating an unofficial slogan of “Long Boi Gang” (referring to the snack itself). The Slim Jim account frequently comments on popular Instagram meme pages, and has gained a fair amount of popularity through this alone.

Slim Jim sponsored Bobby Labonte and David Green when they won the NASCAR Busch Series championship in 1991 and 1994, respectively.

Ingredients
A 2009 Wired article listed some of the ingredients as beef, mechanically separated chicken, lactic acid starter culture, dextrose, salt, sodium nitrite, and hydrolyzed soy. They note that although ConAgra refers to Slim Jim as a "meat stick", it resembles a fermented sausage, such as salami or pepperoni, which uses bacteria and sugar to produce lactic acid, lowering the pH of the sausage to around 5.0 and firming up the meat.

Sodium nitrite is added to prevent the meat from turning gray, and  hydrolyzed soy contains monosodium glutamate.

Varieties
Slim Jim has launched several spin-off products of its main brand. These products are often of higher quality than the original Slim Jim, using premium meats. Such products include both tender steak strips and beef jerky.

The very tender steak strips come in three flavors. Its companion beef jerky comes in four flavors: an original flavor, two spicy flavors, and one smokin' apple flavor.

See also
 List of brand name snack foods
 Peperami
 Kabanos

References

External links

 
 Obituary of the inventor of Slim Jims

Conagra Brands brands
Brand name snack foods
Brand name meats
Products introduced in 1929
Fermented sausages
American snack foods